Brian Tracy is a Canadian-American motivational public speaker and self-development author. He is the author of over eighty books that have been translated into dozens of languages. His popular books are Earn What You're Really Worth, Eat That Frog!, No Excuses! The Power of Self-Discipline and The Psychology of Achievement.

Career
Tracy (born 5th January 1944) is the chairman and chief executive officer (CEO) of Brian Tracy International, a company Tracy founded in 1984 in Vancouver, British Columbia, Canada. It sells counseling on leadership, selling, self-esteem, goals, strategy, creativity, and success psychology. It is headquartered in Bankers Hill, San Diego, California.

Politics
In 2003, Tracy stood as one of 135 candidates in the California gubernatorial recall election on an independent platform, receiving 729 votes. His campaign was featured on the BBC Sunday morning radio show Broadcasting House, where each week presenter Eddie Mair phoned Tracy for an update on how the race was progressing. On election day, Mair flew to California to meet with Tracy in person, only to find that he had gone to Dubai during the final week of campaigning.

Brian Tracy has been a trustee of the conservative think tank The Heritage Foundation since 2003.

Selected bibliography
 The Psychology of Selling: Increase Your Sales Faster and Easier Than You Ever Thought Possible (1988), Thomas Nelson; .
 The Science of Self-Confidence (1991); .
 Maximum Achievement: Strategies and Skills that Will Unlock Your Hidden Powers to Succeed (1993), Simon & Schuster; . 
 Accelerated Learning Techniques (with Colin Rose) (1995), Nightingale-Conant; . 
 How to Master Your Time (1995); . 
 The 21 Success Secrets of Self-Made Millionaires: How to Achieve Financial Independence Faster and Easier Than You Ever Thought Possible (2001), Berrett-Koehler Publishers; .
 Get Paid More and Promoted Faster: 21 Great Ways to Get Ahead in Your Career (2001), Berrett-Koehler Publishers; .
 Hire and Keep the Best People: 21 Practical and Proven Techniques You Can Use Immediately (2001), Berrett-Koehler Publishers; .
 Focal Point: A Proven System to Simplify Your Life, Double Your Productivity, and Achieve All Your Goals (2001), AMACOM; .
 The Psychology of Achievement (2002), Simon & Schuster Audio/Nightingale-Conant; .
 The 100 Absolutely Unbreakable Laws of Business Success (2002), Berrett-Koehler Publishers; .
 Change Your Thinking, Change Your Life: How to Unlock Your Full Potential for Success and Achievement (2003), Wiley & Sons, Incorporated, John; .
 Be a Sales Superstar: 21 Great Ways to Sell More, Faster, Easier in Tough Markets (2003), Berrett-Koehler Publishers; .
 Many Miles to Go: A Modern Parable for Business Success (2003), Entrepreneur Press; .
 The Ultimate Goals Program: How To Get Everything You Want Faster Than You Thought Possible (2003), Simon & Schuster Audio/Nightinga; .
 The Power of Clarity: Find Your Focal Point, Maximize Your Income, Minimize Your Effort (2003); .
 Advanced Selling Strategies (2004); .
 Time Power: A Proven System for Getting More Done in Less Time Than You Ever Thought Possible (2004); .
 TurboCoach: A Powerful System for Achieving Breakthrough Career Success (with Campbell Fraser) (2005), AMACOM; .
 Create Your Own Future: How to Master the 12 Critical Factors of Unlimited Success (2005), Wiley & Sons, Incorporated, John; .
 The Power of Charm: How to Win Anyone Over in Any Situation (2006); .
 The Art of Closing the Sale: The Key to Making More Money Faster in the World of Professional Selling (2007), HarperCollins Focus; .
 Speak to Win: How to Present with Power in Any Situation (2008); .
 The New Psychology of Achievement: Breakthrough Strategies for Success and Happiness in the 21st Century (2008), Simon & Schuster Audio/Nightinga; .
 Flight Plan: The Real Secret of Success (2009), Berrett-Koehler Publishers; .
 Reinvention: How to Make the Rest of Your Life the Best of Your Life (2009), AMACOM; .
 The Miracle of Self-Discipline (2010), Nightingale Conant; .
 No Excuses!: The Power of Self-Discipline (2010), Carroll & Graf; .
 How the Best Leaders Lead: Proven Secrets to Getting the Most Out of Yourself and Others (2010); .
 Goals!: How to Get Everything You Want Faster Than You Ever Thought Possible, 2nd Edition (2010), Berrett-Koehler Publishers; .
 Kiss That Frog!: 21 Great Ways to Turn Negatives into Positives in Your Life and Work (with Christina Tracy Stein) (2012), Berrett-Koehler Publishers; .
 Earn What You're Really Worth: Maximize Your Income at Any Time in Any Market (2012), Carroll & Graf; .
 The Power of Self-Confidence: Become Unstoppable, Irresistible, and Unafraid in Every Area of Your Life (2012); .
 Negotiation (The Brian Tracy Success Library) (2013); .
 Motivation (The Brian Tracy Success Library) (2013); .
 12 Disciplines of Leadership Excellence: How Leaders Achieve Sustainable High Performance (with Peter Chee) (2013), McGraw-Hill Education; .
 Time Management (The Brian Tracy Success Library) (2014); .
 Creativity and Problem Solving (The Brian Tracy Success Library) (2014); .
 Leadership (2014), AMACOM; .
 Find Your Balance Point: Clarify Your Priorities, Simplify Your Life, and Achieve More (with Christina Stein) (2015), Berrett-Koehler Publishers; .
 Sales Success (2015), AMACOM; .
 Master Your Time, Master Your Life: The Breakthrough System to Get More Results, Faster, in Every Area of Your Life (2016); .
 Personal Success (the Brian Tracy Success Library) (2016), AMACOM; .
 Just Shut Up and Do It: 7 Steps to Conquer Your Goals (2016), Sourcebooks, Incorporated; .
 Eat That Frog!: 21 Great Ways to Stop Procrastinating and Get More Done in Less Time, 3rd Edition (2017), Berrett-Koehler Publishers; .
 Million Dollar Habits: Proven Power Practices to Double and Triple Your Income (2017); .
 Believe It to Achieve It: Overcome Your Doubts, Let Go of the Past, and Unlock Your Full Potential (2017); .
 Why People Don’t Believe You…: Building Credibility from the Inside Out (by Rob Jolles, foreword by Brian Tracy) (2018), Berrett-Koehler Publishers; .

References

External links

 
 

1944 births
Living people
American people of Canadian descent
American motivational writers
American motivational speakers
University of Alberta alumni
Writers from Charlottetown